Jean Grey is a member of the X-Men, and has been included in almost every media adaptation of the X-Men franchise, including film, television and video games.

Television and visual media

Early TV appearances
Jean Grey (as Marvel Girl) made her first ever animated appearance on the series The Marvel Super Heroes in the episode of The Sub-Mariner with the original X-Men line-up (Angel, Cyclops, Iceman and Beast).
Jean Grey appeared in Spider-Man and His Amazing Friends in a flashback in "The Origin of Iceman".

X-Men

Jean Grey is a central character in X-Men: The Animated Series, voiced by Catherine Disher. As in the comics, she was in a relationship with Cyclops, eventually marrying him while being the target of Wolverine's unrequited affection. For the most part, she was a warm, friendly person who when necessary stepped in and played peace maker between Cyclops and Wolverine. As far as her relationship with Cyclops was concerned, they were very happy and content with each other, in stark contrast to Gambit and Rogue often fighting and bickering. The entire saga of the Phoenix is retold and adapted in season three, subdivided into the five-part "Phoenix Saga" in which Jean acquires the power of the Phoenix and the battle for the M'Kraan Crystal occurs, and the "Dark Phoenix Saga", showcasing the battle with the Hellfire Club, the Phoenix's transformation into Dark Phoenix (voiced by Tracey Moore), and the battle to decide her fate. These particular episodes are as close as the cartoon came to directly duplicating the comic book storylines – the "Dark Phoenix Saga" is so accurate to the original stories that the episodes have the additional credit "Based on stories by Chris Claremont". She also appears in the 1990s Spider-Man series along with the rest of the X-Men.

X-Men: Evolution

Jean Grey appears as a central character in X-Men: Evolution, voiced by Venus Terzo. She is a popular soccer player, and also teaches and trains the mutant students of Xavier Institute. When humans found out about the existence of mutants, Jean was accused of using her psionic powers for things that she successfully accomplished without using her powers, such as playing soccer in school. At one point, Jean lost control of her powers which caused her to be uncontrollably read people's minds telepathically. The X-Men were having a hard time trying to help her, but luckily Rogue was present and used her own powers to drain enough of Jean's energy for Scott to prompt her to focus on Scott. Jean has a fear of clowns, which Mesmero used to take control of her mind.

At the start of the series, she dated popular but unpleasant football player, Duncan Matthews while struggling with growing feelings for her longtime friend and teammate, Scott Summers. In the third season, Jean finally severed ties with Duncan and began a strong and close romantic relationship with Scott; after saving Scott from nearly being murdered by Mystique.

After Apocalypse's defeat, Professor X had a prophetic vision that Jean would eventually become possessed by the Phoenix Force and become the X-Men's enemy.

Wolverine and the X-Men

Jean Grey appears in Wolverine and the X-Men, voiced by Jennifer Hale. This version became amnesiac after the destruction of the Xavier Institute, and was manipulated by the Hellfire Club. By using the combined telepathic powers of both Emma and the Stepford Cuckoos, they mentally tricked Jean into doing what they wanted by using images of Scott and Professor X. But the mental contact was interrupted by Scott's unusually strong psychic/telepathic connection to Jean. The Stepford Cuckoos then tried to release the Phoenix Force so they could be hosts, and seemingly succeeded. Emma was shocked when she learned the true purpose was for the Inner Circle to control the Phoenix's power when she originally thought that they were trying to release the Phoenix back into space to prevent the world from destruction. Jean and Cyclops then left to fight the Phoenix, but not before Jean angrily pinned Emma to the wall and telekinetically bound Emma with iron pipes after seeing Emma passionately kiss Cyclops. Jean was unable to subdue the Phoenix herself, prompting Cyclops to attack it, only to be struck down as Jean watched in horror. Before the Phoenix could kill Cyclops, Emma, freed by Wolverine, arrived and took the Phoenix Force into herself, seemingly dying in the process. Afterwards, Jean rejoined the X-Men, regaining her memories and reconciling with Cyclops.

The Super Hero Squad Show
Jean Grey appears in The Super Hero Squad Show, voiced by Hynden Walch.

X-Men Anime

Jean Grey appears in Marvel Anime: X-Men, voiced by Yurika Hino in Japanese and again by Jennifer Hale in the English dub. At the beginning of the series, she is consumed by the Phoenix Force and nearly destroys the world with her tremendous power, with the X-Men engaging in a brief battle with her until she ultimately sacrifices herself. Although she dies, she assists the X-Men with conflicts through a strong telepathic link in later episodes, such as saving Professor X from hallucinations and appearing as the White Phoenix of the Crown, encouraging the X-Men to keep on fighting. She was in a close romantic relationship with Cyclops, and had a necklace with a ruby stone with gold in the shape of a phoenix, a gift from him. The necklace was ultimately given to Hisako as a sign that Cyclops can finally let Jean go, as he recognizes her sacrifice as a symbol of love for her friends and the world. Her Dark Phoenix persona is taken from X-Men: The Last Stand, where her face is full of dark veins and her eyes become entirely black.

Iron Man: Armored Adventures
Jean Grey appears in Iron Man: Armored Adventures, with Venus Terzo reprising the role. In this series, she is under the alias Annie Claremont (a composite homage to her friend Annie Richardson's death that triggered her powers and Dark Phoenix Saga writer Chris Claremont). She temporarily enrolls in the same school Tony Stark, James Rhodes and Pepper Potts attend while looking for a special school for mutants in the area, and after telepathically learning about Tony and Rhodey's secret, she confides in them. Tony and Rhodes, after sympathizing with her, rush to her aid when she is kidnapped and coerced by Magneto to assassinate rabid anti-mutant politician Senator Kelly. After defeating Magneto with the help of her new friends, she is approached by Professor Charles Xavier offering her a place in the institute.

Film

Fox Franchise 

Jean Grey/Phoenix appears in seven of the thirteen films of 20th Century Fox's X-Men franchise, initially portrayed by Famke Janssen as an adult and later by Sophie Turner as a teenager in the prequel films.

Jean first appears as a main character in the first film, X-Men, as a doctor at Professor Xavier's School for the Gifted, as well as a speaker for mutants' rights. At the mansion, she is introduced to Logan/Wolverine who shows an attraction to her, which she seems to reciprocate, if slightly, due to her relationship with Scott Summers.  Later in the film, she treats Senator Kelly after he is transformed into a mutant by Magneto's machine, though he dies soon after. She also fixes a sabotaged Cerebro and makes the risky choice to use the machine herself to find Rogue, though the experience drains her. In the film's climactic battle against the Brotherhood of Mutants, Jean and Storm battle Toad. She later telekinetically aids Cyclops in regaining his visor to defeat Sabretooth, and uses her telekinesis to guide Wolverine to Magneto's machine, freeing Rogue moments before the Brotherhood's plan was accomplished. Following the battle, while treating Logan again, Logan admits feelings for her; she attempts to turn them down politely, but Logan quickly changes the subject, while kissing her hand.

In X2, Janssen's depiction continues to work at Xavier's School, while her powers have slowly been growing unstable since the battle at Liberty Island. Following an assassination attempt on the President by a mutant, Nightcrawler, Jean and Storm are sent by Xavier to track him down. After Colonel William Stryker attacks the school and most of the mutants are forced to flee, Logan contacts Jean to pick him, Rogue, Iceman and Pyro up in Boston. Throughout the film, Jean shows a strong increase in her abilities. In the end, after rescuing the captured mutants with the help of Magneto and Mystique and fighting a brainwashed Cyclops, Jean is forced to unleash her fully developed powers when a dam bursts near the Blackbird. She creates a massive psychic barrier to hold back the entire wave of Alkali Lake while lifting the repaired Blackbird out of harm's way, seemingly dying in the process.

 
In X-Men: The Last Stand, Jean is overtaken by her Dark Phoenix persona. After being found alive by Scott (who vanishes soon after), Jean is brought back to the mansion, where Xavier reveals to a shocked Logan that due to the instability of Jean's powers, he created psychic barriers inside her mind to prevent her alternate personality, the destructive Phoenix, from taking over. Jean awakens shortly after with the Phoenix in control and starts kissing and seducing Logan. He resists her advances and tries to talk to the real Jean. Suddenly, Jean snaps back to her usual self. She and begs Logan to kill her before the Phoenix takes over, but he doesn't want to. The Phoenix takes control and knocks Logan out. She leaves the mansion for her childhood home where both the X-Men and the Brotherhood track her down; though Xavier attempts to placate Jean, the Phoenix takes over again and disintegrates Xavier, destroys most of the house, and joins the Brotherhood under Magneto. Jean watches the film's climactic battle sequence on Alcatraz Island between the X-Men and the military and the Brotherhood, but refuses to obey Magneto. After Magneto is defeated, the Phoenix devastates Alcatraz Island, wiping out the military and most of Magneto's army. Magneto and the X-Men escape while Logan stays behind to reach Jean, his healing factor keeping him from being vaporised completely. Jean temporarily regains control and begs Logan to save her; he stabs her fatally after telling her he loves her. She is buried on the school grounds next to the graves of Xavier and Scott. Haley Ramm also portrays a young Jean's first meeting with Charles Xavier and Magneto in a flashback at the beginning of the film taking place twenty years before the events of the first film.

In The Wolverine, Logan continues to be haunted by dreams of his role in Jean's death. However, in the film's climax, after saving his new lover, Mariko Yashida, from the Silver Samurai, Logan has a final vision of Jean in which he finally lets go of her while telling her that he will always love her.

In X-Men: Days of Future Past, Jean is mentioned when the time-displaced Wolverine encourages the young Charles Xavier to later recruit Jean for the future team, along with Ororo Munroe and Scott, arguing that the good they accomplished outweighs the bad they experienced. Commentary in the film confirms that the young red-haired girl's identity in the field who was marveling at Magneto levitating the Robert F. Kennedy stadium was in fact her character as a young child. When the timeline reset, Logan is astonished to discover that Jean and Cyclops are alive and well in the new timeline, suggesting that the events of the original X-Men films played out very differently.

A younger version of Jean, now portrayed by Sophie Turner, appears in X-Men: Apocalypse. Jean is introduced as a young student at Xavier's School for Gifted Youngsters. After meeting Scott Summers, Jean explains that other students are afraid of her because the unreached full potential of her powers. Jean is affected by the energy wave released by an ancient, godlike mutant who had awakened that day. This causes Jean to have a nightmare of the world ending during which the entire school shakes, most of the students are awoken from sleep, and the Professor hurries to her room to find that her telekinetic powers, already immensely strong, are quite literally burning the walls of her room. Jean is reassured by Xavier that she is not losing control of her powers, despite her doubts. When the mansion is destroyed, she comforts Scott over the loss of his brother and conceals herself, Scott, and Nightcrawler from Stryker's men. While in Stryker's base, she connects with Weapon X (Wolverine) and releases him from his cell. Before he, fearfully, leaves the complex Jean restores the few remaining memories of his that she can. She then joins the fight in Cairo where she telekinetically protects the group from Angel's metal wings. After Xavier is saved, he mentally links with her and reveals to Apocalypse that he is not the most powerful psychic, and convinces Jean to unleash the full extent of her powers. Aided with Cyclops, Storm and Magneto, she weakens Apocalypse until he incinerates. She is last seen helping to re-build the mansion, alongside Erik Lensherr, before joining Cyclops, Storm, Nightcrawler, Quicksilver, under the leadership of Hank and Raven, to become the new official team of X-Men and preparing to test her powers in her very first Danger Room session against a group of Mark I Sentinels.

Turner reprises her role in the 2019 film Dark Phoenix, which more faithfully adapts The Dark Phoenix Saga. Taking place in 1992, 9 years after Apocalypse, the X-Men are hailed as national heroes thanks to their defeat of En Sabah Nur. However, the X-Men are going on more increasingly risky missions and during a rescue mission in space, the Phoenix inside Jean is unleashed after she is struck by a solar flare. After accidentally killing Raven when the X-Men track Jean to her childhood home, Jean seeks refuge from Magneto on Genosha, though she is turned down. After meeting the shapeshifting alien Vuk, Jean learns of the Phoenix's history. The X-Men arrive to protect Jean from Magneto and his new Brotherhood, but they are all stopped by Jean with ease. They are all taken by the military, though Vuk chases after them, desiring to absorb the Phoenix Force. After being reminded of her love for the X-Men, Jean awakens and saves everyone from Vuk's attacks before flying Vuk into space and unleashing the Phoenix, seemingly dying in the process. However, the film's ending moments shows a flaming Phoenix appearing in the sky.

Jean is mentioned in Logan, where, five years after the events of Days of Future Past, it is revealed that many of the X-Men, including Jean, have all been accidentally killed by Xavier's first telepathic seizure. In a deleted scene, while eating with the Munson family, Logan is asked if he has ever been married. In his grief, and not remembering what truly happened, but rather loosely interpreting the events of X-Men: The Last Stand from the original timeline, Xavier claims that Jean was Logan's wife whom Logan killed by accident. Logan laughs and claims Xavier is confused, but is still shown to be visibly shaken by Jean's death. Deadpool 2 features an Easter egg to Jean Grey's alter-ego "Phoenix" with a moving truck company called "Phoenix Moving" in the film. She is absent from the X-Men's roster in their cameo, implying she hasn't returned yet since leaving Earth in 1992.

Marvel Cinematic Universe
After Disney purchased Fox and Marvel regained the rights to the X-Men, Marvel Studios head Kevin Feige announced that a film centered on mutants is in development and will be set in the Marvel Cinematic Universe.

Video games 
 Marvel Girl appeared as a playable character in X-Men II: The Fall of the Mutants for the PC.
 Jean Grey was a supporting character in the X-Men video game for the Sega Genesis, appearing to rescue the player from falling into fatal pits.
 Jean Grey appeared as a non-playable character in Cyclops's and Wolverine's endings in the arcade game X-Men: Children of the Atom.
 Jean Grey appeared as a playable character in X-Men: Gamemaster's Legacy for the Sega Game Gear.
 Phoenix was a playable character in X-Men: Mutant Academy, again voiced by Catherine Disher for the Sony PlayStation.
 Phoenix reappears in the sequel X-Men: Mutant Academy 2.
 Jean Grey is playable in X-Men: Next Dimension for the PS2, Xbox, and Nintendo GameCube, voiced by Jenette Goldstein. Phoenix and Dark Phoenix appear as separate playable characters.
 Jean Grey appears as a playable character in X-Men Legends and X-Men Legends II: Rise of Apocalypse, voiced by Leigh-Allyn Baker. Her Phoenix persona is also a playable character and her Dark Phoenix persona appears in the game's PSP version.
 Phoenix has a small part in X-Men: The Official Game, voiced by Katherine Morgan.
 In X-Men: Destiny, Phoenix is shown to have been slain like Professor X.
 Jean Grey appears as a playable character in Marvel Super Hero Squad Online, voiced by Tara Strong. Her Marvel Girl persona possesses telepathic and telekinetic powers which are pink in color and has the ability to fly. Her Phoenix version has powers that include fire blasts, flight, and healing.
 Jean Grey is briefly mentioned by Spider-Man in Spider-Man: Edge of Time.
 Phoenix appears as a playable character in the Facebook game Marvel: Avengers Alliance. Her moveset includes Psi-blast, Telekinesis, Mind Link and Phoenix Fire which are continuously obtained at the beginning, level 2, level 6, and finally level 9.
 Phoenix appears as a playable character in the fighting game Marvel Avengers: Battle for Earth, voiced by Laura Bailey.
 Jean Grey is a playable character in the MMORPG Marvel Heroes, voiced by April Stewart.
 Jean Grey is a playable character in Lego Marvel Super Heroes, voiced again by Laura Bailey. Her alternate outfits are a 1990s variant, Phoenix variant and a PS3/360 pre-order exclusive Dark Phoenix variant.
 Phoenix appears as a playable character in Marvel: Contest of Champions.
 Phoenix appears as a playable character in 2015 game Marvel: Future Fight. She appears as a special character begins with native Tier-2, and needs to advance Rogue, Storm, Cyclops, Magneto, and Wolverine into Tier-2 to unlock her. She has 3 uniforms: Phoenix, X-Men Red and Marvel Girl uniform. As Phoenix, her attacks are mainly energy & flame damage, while in X-Men Red & Marvel Girl uniforms her attacks are mainly energy & mind damage. She currently is the only universal mutant (via Marvel Girl uniform), and her Tier-3 ultimate attack is called "Revelation" where she flies upwards with cosmic flames emerging in her vicinity, before summoning Phoenix Force & burning enemies even more. Her ultimate attack deals flame damage.
 Jean Grey is available as a playable character in Marvel Puzzle Quest. Two versions are separate playable characters: the time-shifted younger version from All-New X-Men was added to the game in July 2015, and the rarer Phoenix version became available in November 2015.
 Jean Grey as Phoenix is a playable character in Marvel Super War. Her default skin is redesigned green and gold Phoenix costume, and her alternate skin is redesigned White Phoenix costume. In this game, Jean can use combinations of her powers which are signed under specific color: telepathy (under the name of Psionic Energy signed under blue color), telekinesis (yellow), and Phoenix Force (red) to deal damage, or to protect herself from damage and crowd control effects. Upgrading each power will boost her abilities in game; upgrading Psionic Energy boosts her EP regeneration, upgrading Telekinesis boosts her HP regeneration, and upgrading Phoenix Force boosts her energy penetration. Her passive is Rise from the Ashes, which allows her to resurrect herself in set amount of time, and it will go under cooldown if her passive either succeeds or fails. Each type of skill has 3 combinations; with total of ten skills as the tenth skill is her ultimate. Her Psionic Energy skills are Psionic Aegis, Psionic Bolt, and Psionic Barrier. Her Telekinesis skills are Telekinetic Blast, Telekinetic Branding, and Telekinetic Aura. Her Phoenix Force skills are Phoenix Flame, Phoenix Skyfire, and Phoenix Spark. Her ultimate skill is Phoenix Nova, where by combining all of her Psionic Energy, Telekinesis, and Phoenix Force, she unleashes a cosmic fire blast centered upon her and dealing damage globally to all enemies on map.
 Jean Grey appears as a purchasable outfit in Fortnite Battle Royale as Dark Phoenix.

Marvel Ultimate Alliance series 
Jean Grey appears in the Marvel: Ultimate Alliance series of games.
 Phoenix appears in Marvel: Ultimate Alliance, voiced by Sarah Waits. She is a NPC for the every versions, but Game Boy Advance version where she is one of the strikers. In the primary gameplay versions, she is initially kidnapped by Arcade putting her under mind control and forces her to battle the player's team. After she is rescued, she assists the player's mission to rescue Nightcrawler from Mephisto's realm, only to be captured by Blackheart in the process. After defeating Blackheart, the player has the choice to save either Jean or Nightcrawler, since saving one results in the other's death. If Nightcrawler was rescued, then Jean will be resurrected by Mephisto (this will occur during the game). After you defeat Phoenix during the fight against Mephisto, Jean Grey-Summers dismisses herself as an echo of her past self and sacrifices her life to defeat Mephisto. In the end of the game, it is revealed if the player let Jean die, she will return as the Dark Phoenix and exact her revenge on those who did not save her. On a side note, she has special dialogue with Nightcrawler, Wolverine, Invisible Woman, and Cyclops. On the game's PC Version, Jean is available as a playable Mod character from Marvel Mods. There are several versions of Jean which give her different powersets. These include powersets from the 1990s, Morrison's Run, current Phoenix, Dark Phoenix, and Goblin Queen. She also has powersets based on her XML2 and MUA2 (both the Xbox 360/PS3 and the PSP/PS2/WII) versions. She has many costumes including all her Phoenix costumes, Marvel Girl, Original X-Men, First Class, Black Queen, Maddie Pryor, AOA, Ultimate, 1990s, Here Comes Tomorrow, New X-Men, Evolution, Movie, X-Factor, as well as many custom costumes. On PC mod patch provided by Marvel Mods that both Jean Grey and Nightcrawler can be saved from the Void by a telekinetic user (mainly Magneto by default), then both Jean and Nightcrawler manage to catch up with their four allies, whose having a trouble defeating Mephisto due to his realm is a source of his unlimited power, leaving Jean, whose Phoenix Force can match Mephisto's power finishes the demon lord for good, and with the two X-Men are finally returned safely.
 Jean Grey appears as a playable character in Marvel: Ultimate Alliance 2, voiced by Molly Hagan. This game appears to retcon Jean and Nightcrawler's previous fates depends on the player's choices in the previous game. She can be unlocked by collecting 5 shards of the M'Kraan Crystal. Her default costume is her Phoenix costume. She uses telepathy, telekinesis, and the power of the Phoenix. Jean's alternate costume is her X-Men: First Class costume and she fits in the X-Men, Masters of Energy, Repentant Killers, Natural Leaders, and Femme Fatales team bonuses. Since she is a playable character in this game, her fate in the first game is non-canon. In the game she has a special conversation with Cable, however, this conversation is only available if you pick Anti-Registration in the game, it deals on their family relationship and the status on the Civil War. Jean also has the unique ability to possibly resurrect herself from the dead in both versions of the game. In-game, whenever Jean picks up an object the object hovers, giving the effect that Jean is holding the object with her tk. During her block, whenever she is hit by a projectile a telekinetic shield is partially visible. There is quite a difference in the PS2/PSP/Wii version of her and her Xbox 360/PS3 version. In the former, Jean's telekinesis and telepathy is in the form of her pink energy signature, along with some fiery powers, and most of the animations are completely from X-Men Legends II. She also harnesses the signature Phoenix raptor during fusions. In the latter version, all of Jean's powers are fiery energy, including her telekinesis and telepathy. No Phoenix Raptor is in this version of her. Jean is not playable in the DS Version. Jean also appears on the back of the MUA2 cover for all versions. For some reason on the back of the cover she possess the fiery mane type of hair that she had under the artistic work of Phil Jimenez and Greg Land, but in the actual game, she has straight hair.
 Jean Grey returns as a downloadable playable character in Marvel: Ultimate Alliance 3, this time goes by her well-known codename, Phoenix. Her Dark Phoenix form is the antagonist of the X-Men DLC pack where Jean is included alongside three other X-Men (Iceman, Gambit, and Cable). Jennifer Hale reprises her role from Ultimate Marvel vs Capcom 3, Wolverine and the X-Men and Marvel Anime: X-Men. Phoenix's default costume is her green and gold "Phoenix" costume, and her alternative costume is her red and gold "Dark Phoenix" costume. Phoenix's other costume includes her Marvel Girl costume. Phoenix's abilities in the game include a mixture of fiery abilities mixed with her telekinetic abilities. Phoenix is able to revive herself and other team members by using her ultimate attack.

Marvel vs. Capcom 3: Fate of Two Worlds 

 Jean Grey as Phoenix is a playable character in Marvel vs Capcom 3: Fate of Two Worlds, voiced once again by Jennifer Hale. She has the lowest health of any character in the game, but compensates for this by having tremendous damage output. She can teleport at distances, use telekinesis for her throw attacks, and heal her red-damage life bar with Healing Field Level 1 hyper (by getting close to enemies). Her main projectile attack is TK Shot, a cosmic fireball that varies in speed depending on the button pressed. Her one and only offensive Hyper Combo is Phoenix Rage, where she shoots a huge cosmic Phoenix raptor at her enemy, heavily burning enemy at contact. If her lifebar is emptied with the Hyper Combo gauge at maximum (5), she will transform into Dark Phoenix. Although her health is completely restored upon turning into the Dark Phoenix, her life bar depletes at a steady rate. However, her attacks become more powerful and her Hyper Combo gauge refills at a faster rate than normal. Phoenix sports four alternate color schemes based on her classic look, her early 1990s appearance drawn by Jim Lee, which shares similarities with her appearance in Chris Claremont's X-Men Forever, and her costumes from Greg Pak's X-Men: Phoenix – Endsong and Grant Morrison's New X-Men.

 Phoenix has two additional colors as well as a DLC costume in Ultimate Marvel vs. Capcom 3. The DLC costume is available in The Dead Rising Pack and it is her 1990s Jim Lee look. The pack was released on 22 November 2011 and was the first pack to be released. The pack also contains additional costumes for Ghost Rider, Frank West and Nemesis.

Toys 
Jean Grey-Summers has appeared in several X-Men toy lines, including the popular Marvel Legends line. Her first figure appeared within the Shi'ar assortment of X-Men figures, with her wearing her green Phoenix costume and included an electronic light up hair and eyes feature. Eventually a Jean in her 1990s outfit was offered as part of an exclusive line called She-Force (Subsequently, the figure was only a repaint of a previous figure). Later, she was a part of the Onslaught assortment, this time wearing he blue and yellow costume that she wore for most of the 1990s, which was oddly preposed with very little articulation. Following this figure, she was a part of the X-Men Space Riders assortment, wearing a variation of her 1990s costume that also included added space suit parts.  After this, a better looking, more articulated version of Jean in her 1990s outfit was designed and shown at Toyfair. Unfortunately, the line had later been canceled and the figure never saw release.

In Marvel Legends series 6, she appeared in her Phoenix (green) costume, with a Dark Phoenix variant. The Phoenix figure was later re-released as part of the X-Men Classics Line. A figure of Jean Grey from X-Men: The Last Stand was released in the second series of Marvel Legends from Hasbro with a Dark Phoenix variant as well.

A Phoenix figurine has also been released as part of the "Superhero Squad" line of non-articulated figurines. These small scale figurines depict famous Superheroes in "kiddie" variations. Phoenix is released as a two-pack with the brown and orange costumed Wolverine. A Dark Phoenix variant has also been released as a Toys 'R' Us exclusive boxset.

A Phoenix toy was created based on the first X-Men movie. Three different variants were released. The first had her with an open top, no bra, and her hair down. The second had a redesigned head with her hair tied back, and a bra painted on underneath her open top.  The third had the same tied back hair do, but the chest was redone and closed up, making it the most accurate of the three variations.

A Jean Grey-Summers figure was also created as part of Toy Biz's Famous Covers assortment. The figure depicted her in her blue and yellow 1990s outfit.

Jean Grey is the eleventh figurine in the Classic Marvel Figurine Collection.

Literature 
Jean is one of the main characters in the Chaos Engine trilogy, where a trio of villains- Doctor Doom, Magneto and the Red Skull- acquire a flawed Cosmic Cube and attempt to use it to rewrite reality to  fit their desires. Jean was one of the few X-Men initially unaffected by the reality rewrite as they were in the Starlight Citadel when Doom changed history, but they become caught in the subsequent changes when Magneto and the Red Skull capture the Cube. In the second book, Jean is rewritten as a loyal follower of Magneto's pursuit of human/mutant equality, but in the third book, she is reduced to a housewife in a Nazi-ruled Earth married to Scott Sommers, here a major leader of the Nazi war fleet who hides his own mutant status. Fortunately, since the Jean of the Nazi world has no psychic training, the "original" Jean is able to re-take control of her body. She is briefly captured by the Charles Xavier of this world, who helps betray mutants to the government in exchange for his own freedom, but Jean is able to rally and restore the other X-Men in time to both stop Doctor Doom taking over the Citadel and then take the Cube from the Skull to restore reality.

Jean Grey was reinterpreted as Julia Ash in The Refrigerator Monologues.

References